The Ingebrigtsen family is a Norwegian family of athletes, including father Gjert, mother Tone, and sons Henrik, Filip, and Jakob, as well as four other children: Kristoffer, Martin, Ingrid, and William. The family is the subject of a TV series, Team Ingebrigtsen.

References

 
Ingebrigtsen